Chip Taylor (born James Wesley Voight; March 21, 1940) is an American songwriter and singer noted for writing "Angel of the Morning" and "Wild Thing".

Early life 
Taylor was born on March 21, 1940, in Yonkers, New York. He is the brother of actor Jon Voight and geologist Barry Voight and the uncle of actress Angelina Jolie and actor James Haven. Taylor and his brothers attended Archbishop Stepinac High School in White Plains, New York. In 1961, Taylor attended the University of Hartford in Hartford, Connecticut, for one year.

After an unsuccessful attempt to become a professional golfer like his father Elmer Voight, Taylor entered the music business.

Career

As "tune tailor" 
Taylor wrote many pop and rock songs, both alone and with other songwriters, including Al Gorgoni (with whom he also performed, as the duo Just Us), Billy Vera, Ted Daryll, and Jerry Ragovoy, first freelancing and then as an employee of a New York City music publisher.

Taylor's first big hit was "Wild Thing", which, though originally recorded in 1965 by Jordan Christopher & the Wild Ones, became famous as both a 1966 hit single for the Troggs and a 1967 live performance by Jimi Hendrix, and was later covered by the Runaways, the Muppets, and X. His second most recognizable song, "Angel of the Morning", was originally recorded by Evie Sands in 1967, before becoming a hit for Merrilee Rush and also P. P. Arnold in 1968, then a million-selling single in 1981 for country-pop singer Juice Newton; later a rendition from Chrissie Hynde was released. Other notable pop and country songs written by Taylor include "He Sits at Your Table" (Willie Nelson), "I Can't Let Go" (Evie Sands, the Hollies, Linda Ronstadt), "The Baby" (the Hollies), "Worry" (Johnny Tillotson), "Make Me Belong to You" (Barbara Lewis), "I Can Make It With You" (the Pozo Seco Singers, Jackie DeShannon), "Any Way That You Want Me" (the Troggs, Evie Sands, Melanie, American Breed, Juice Newton, Lita Ford, Liverpool Five) "Step Out of Your Mind" (American Breed), "Country Girl City Man" (Billy Vera and Judy Clay), "I'll Hold Out My Hand", "Try (Just a Little Bit Harder)" (Lorraine Ellison, Janis Joplin), "Julie" (Bobby Fuller Four, Marshall Crenshaw), "Lonely Is As Lonely Does" (the Fleetwoods), "Sweet Dream Woman" (Waylon Jennings), "A Little Bit Later On Down the Line" (Bobby Bare), "Rock Soldiers" (Ace Frehley), and "Son of a Rotten Gambler" (Emmylou Harris, the Hollies, Anne Murray).

Shaggy used "Angel of the Morning" as the basis for his hit "Angel" in 2001.

In 2009, Ace Records released a compilation CD of some of Taylor's compositions as recorded by other artists (Wild Thing: The Songs of Chip Taylor).

His own recordings 

Taylor's first releases were on the King label and their subsidiary DeLuxe. In 1958, he and the Town Three released two 45s on DeLuxe, numbers 6176 "Midnight Blues" and 6180 "I Want a Lover". In 1959, he recorded for King as Wes Voight on 5211 "I'm Movin' In", and his final recording as Wes Voight on King 5231 "I'm Ready to Go Steady" and "The Wind and the Cold Black Night". The two King 45s were released in both mono and stereo, making them some of the first stereo singles available. Taylor has released recordings on Warner Bros., Columbia, and Capitol.  His first chart single was his recording (as Chip Taylor) of "Here I Am" in 1962 on Warner Bros. Records. He also had a top 40 hit in Australia in 1963 with "Sandy Sandy" with the Town and Country Brothers, a later iteration of Wes Voight and the Town Three, with Ted Daryll (who wrote the song) and Greg Richards, writers of "She Cried" by Jay and the Americans.

Performing and recording in the 1990s and the 21st century 
Taylor restarted his performing and recording career in 1993.

At the 2001 South by Southwest Music Conference in Austin, Texas, Taylor met singer and violinist Carrie Rodriguez, with whom he performed and recorded Americana music for several years. The duo recorded Let's Leave This Town in 2002. They released The Trouble With Humans the following year and the critically acclaimed Red Dog Tracks in 2005. Each has since released successful solo albums. Taylor's double-CD Unglorious Hallelujah/Red Red Rose, his first solo album in five years, was quickly hailed as "a future classic" by Sonic Magazine, whose reviewer declared: "This is the best we've heard from Chip Taylor so far."  Rodriguez's solo album, Seven Angels on a Bicycle, was released in August 2006. In late 2006 and early 2007, Rodriguez toured on her own but continued to perform with Taylor from time to time. Taylor has done a series of shows with guitarist John Platania and the young singer/fiddler Kendel Carson, and he produced both their 2007 albums.

Taylor has performed with alt-country singer-songwriter Robbie Fulks, playing bass for Fulks's January 2004 date at the Double Door in Chicago.

During the 21st century through 2020, Taylor has continued to perform with his band The New Ukrainians ([John Platania on electric guitar, Björn Petterson on bass, and a revolving cast of other musicians). Each concert almost always includes both "Wild Thing" and "Angel in the Morning".

Taylor's album Yonkers, NY was a 2011 nominee for a Grammy Award for best recording package, but lost to Brothers by the Black Keys.

Train Wreck Records 
In 2007, Taylor launched his own independent label, Train Wreck Records.

Personal life 
By Taylor's own accounts, from 1980 through 1995 he was very successful at, but unhappily addicted to, gambling professionally on blackjack in New Jersey casinos and on horse races.  He then returned to music, starting by singing to his dying mother, Barbara Voight. Taylor has said that the gambling addiction was hard on both himself and his family.  He has written that, after having an epiphany, he changed his attitude and created the "Church of the Train Wreck" self-help program for himself and others.

As of 2019, Taylor continues to live in New York City. He has been married to Joan Carole Frey since 1964, and they have children and grandchildren. (Joan and Chip were temporarily divorced for several years, starting in the 1990s.)

Discography

Albums

Compilations

Singles

Music videos

References

External links 

Interview with Chip Taylor by Spectropop
Cover History of Wild Thing on Second Hand Songs
Train Wreck Records site for Chip Taylor

 

1940 births
American gamblers
American country singer-songwriters
American male singer-songwriters
Record producers from New York (state)
Living people
People from Yonkers, New York
Country musicians from New York (state)
Singers from New York City
Voight family
Archbishop Stepinac High School alumni
University of Hartford alumni
American people of German descent
American people of Slovak descent
Buddah Records artists
Warner Records artists
CBS Records artists
Capitol Records artists
Singer-songwriters from New York (state)